Chhanna (Nepali: छान्ना ) is a Gaupalika(Nepali: गाउपालिका ; gaupalika) in Bajhang District in the Sudurpashchim Province of far-western Nepal. 
Chhanna has a population of 15893.The land area is 113.52 km2.

References

Rural municipalities in Bajhang District
Rural municipalities of Nepal established in 2017